The Philip Merrill College of Journalism is a journalism school located at the University of Maryland, College Park. The college was founded in 1947 and was named after newspaper editor Philip Merrill in 2001. The school has about 550 undergraduates and 70 graduate students enrolled.

The school awards B.A., M.A., M.J. and Ph.D. degrees in journalism. Undergraduates can focus on broadcast or multi-platform journalism.

A Washington Post recruiter has said the college is one of the nation's best journalism schools.

The university's student newspaper, The Diamondback, is not affiliated with the school. However, the school provides opportunities for students to publish work with the Capital News Service (Maryland), a wire service serving print, broadcast and online media in the Washington, D.C. region and Maryland Newsline, a live half-hour three-day-per-week news broadcast (during the fall and spring semesters) that reaches more than 500,000 households in the greater Washington metropolitan area. The newscast is now streamed via YouTube in HD.

The three college-sponsored student news outlets—the nightly television show, online news magazine, and weekly radio show—have all been named the best in the nation by the Society of Professional Journalists in the last few years.

The school is home to the National Association of Black Journalists, the largest organization of journalists of color in the U.S. From 1987 to 2015, the university published the American Journalism Review, a magazine covering print, television, radio and online media; in 2013 AJR became an online-only publication, and in 2015, the college announced that it was terminating the journal.

Faculty 
The school's faculty has won a combined 17 Pulitzer Prizes and Peabody Awards. The Pulitzer Prize winners include Knight Chair Dana Priest (The Washington Post), Jon Franklin (The Baltimore Sun), and Deborah Nelson (The Seattle Times). 

Emmy Award winners include Eaton Broadcast Chair Mark Feldstein.

Building 
The school was formerly housed in the Journalism building located next to McKeldin Library; the building was the smallest on campus to be home to a college. Most of the broadcast facilities, including the Maryland Newsline studio, are located in nearby Tawes Hall.

The college moved into a new journalism building, the John S. and James L. Knight Hall, on January 4, 2010.

Alumni 
Connie Chung, former anchor and reporter for NBC, CBS, ABC, CNN, and MSNBC.
Mark Davis, talk show host and writer, KSKY Dallas-Ft Worth, Salem Media Group, Dallas Morning News, townhall.com
Giuliana Rancic, E! News presenter and TV personality.
Jon Franklin, two time Pulitzer Prize winner
Jane Healey, Pulitzer winner with the Orlando Sentinel
Patrick Sloyan, Pulitzer winner with Newsday
Sarah Cohen, Pulitzer winner with The Washington Post
Megha Rajagopalan, Pulitzer winner with BuzzFeed news.
Scott Van Pelt, ESPN Sportscenter anchor (left the university one course short of completing his degree requirements)
Mi-Ai Parrish, president and publisher Arizona Republic, azcentral.com, kansascity.com, Kansas City Star and Idaho Statesman; first minority in all; first female publisher of the Kansas City Star.
Tim Kurkjian, ESPN Baseball writer and reporter
Jimmy Roberts, NBC Sports Host
David Mills, Emmy-winning TV writer and producer
Bonnie Bernstein, ESPN and CBS sportscaster
Pam Ward, ESPN play-by-play commentator; first female play-by-play announcer for college football in television history
Carl Bernstein, who worked with Bob Woodward to uncover the Watergate Scandal, attended the school but did not graduate
John A. Jenkins, publisher of Congressional Quarterly
Christine Delargy, 2012 Walter Cronkite Award for Excellence in Television Political Journalism, former senior producer and video content manager for POLITICO
Dick Jerardi, Philadelphia Daily News Sportswriter, 2014 elected to the United States Basketball Sportswriters Association Hall of Fame
Emilio Garcia-Ruiz, editor-in-chief of the San Francisco Chronicle.

References

External links
 
 

Journalism schools in the United States
University of Maryland, College Park
Educational institutions established in 1947
1947 establishments in Maryland